The 1990 Central Regional Council election, the fifth election to Central Regional Council, was held on 3 May 1990 as part of the wider 1990 Scottish regional elections. The election saw Labour retain a majority on the 34 seat council.

Aggregate Results

Ward Results

References

1990 Scottish local elections
May 1990 events in the United Kingdom